Eamonn O'Brien is former manager of Meath and one of Sean Boylan's former selectors. He was born in Walterstown, County Meath, Ireland on September 21, 1960. He managed the Meath Senior Gaelic football team between 2008 and 2010, leading them to one Leinster Senior Football Championship.

Managerial career
O'Brien was confirmed as Meath manager on 10 November 2008 after a meeting with the county board to succeed Colm Coyle.  His team had a reasonably successful 2009 season, where they were defeated by Dublin in the Leinster quarter finals, but went through the qualifier system to reach the All-Ireland semi finals, where they were defeated by Kerry.

In 2010, O'Brien's team comprehensively defeated Dublin in the Leinster Semi finals, and went on to win the Leinster final in controversial circumstances against Louth.  In this match, Meath forward Joe Sheridan was awarded a goal in the final minutes which on replay evidence should not have stood, to give Meath a 2-point win. Appeals for a replay were refused.  Meath went on to be beaten by Kildare in the All-Ireland Quarter Finals.

On 6 September 2010 O'Brien was unexpectedly axed as manager after many of the county's clubs voted him out.
On November 10, 2010, Former Monaghan manager Seamus McEnaney was confirmed as the new Meath manager.

References

Living people
People from County Meath
Gaelic football managers
1960 births